András Kormos (3 April 1952 – 7 January 2005) was a Hungarian rower. He competed at the 1972 Summer Olympics and the 1980 Summer Olympics.

References

External links
 
 
 

1952 births
2005 deaths
Hungarian male rowers
Olympic rowers of Hungary
Rowers at the 1972 Summer Olympics
Rowers at the 1980 Summer Olympics
Sportspeople from Győr